The Société Nationale des Autoroutes du Maroc (ADM) is Morocco's national authority for the management of over 1400+ km of Moroccan expressways. ADM is based in Rabat.

ADM runs the network on a pay-per-use basis, with toll stations placed along its length. Rental-income from rest-areas and services (fuel, food and drink outlets etc.) form a second income beside the collected toll-revenues.

Not only the management of existing roads is ADM's responsibility, management of construction projects and planning of future extensions is part of their mission.

History
The total length of paved roads in Morocco has grown dramatically over the past decades, and doubled from 14.500 km in 1956 to over 30.000 km now. Studies in the early seventies predicted a growth in traffic-load of 6% a year, meaning that every twelve years the traffic doubles.
In 1975 construction started on the first stage of the motorway between Casablanca and Rabat. Financial restrictions slowed down development and the opening of the last section had to wait until 1987. Two years later the ADM was officially formed.
Since that date other motorways were developed. One instrument to allow faster construction was introduction of toll. Revenues could then be used to repay investments.

Road construction
After completion of the Casablanca-Rabat expressway new developments contributed in completing the much wanted North-South and East-West main links. The East-West link runs from Rabat via Fez to Oujda. The first stage is completed as the Rabat-Fes expressway and the Fes-Oujda expressway is under construction.

The North-South link is formed with Casablanca as startpoint:
 Casablanca to Tanger, Tétouan and Fnideq using Rabat-Tangier expressway
 Casablanca via Marrakech to Agadir using Casablanca-Marrakesh expressway and Marrakech-Agadir expressway
 Casablanca to El Jadida

Managing projects
ADM uses projects to manage the development of new roads. Each project has its own finances (budget, investors) and most projects split up in segments. Call for bids for each segment are then published and generly open for national and international bidders.

Recently completed roads
Two projects were completed in the last years:
Fes-Oujda expressway - 320 km road built between 2007 and 2011 Total actual investment: 10800 MDH
Marrakech-Agadir expressway- 223 km road built between 2006 and 2010 Total actual investment: 6025 MDH
widening the Casablanca-Rabat expressway from 2 x 2 to 2 x 3 lanes
Realisation between 2009 and 2012, projected budget 800 MDH
Berrechid- Beni Mellal expressway - built between 2010 and 2015
Rabat Ringroad - built between 2011 and 2016

El Jadida - Safi expressway - 144 km built between 2011 and 2016.

The company

ADM is set up as a société anonyme and its market capital of 6.507.628.500 dirhams has been brought together by:
 Fonds Hassan II (the Hasan II Fund): 61,47%
 Trésor public of Morocco : 33,11%
 Public corporations : 2,09%
 Banks and (other) institutional investors : 0,76%
 the Kuwait Investment Authority : 1,74%
 others : 0,83%

In 2008 the company will invest 6.684 million dirhams (Approximately 610 million Euro)

Management
The board of directors of ADM is formed by real men and representatives of major investors:

On top of these board-members, major stakeholders have also a representative in the board

Above list is not complete and is based on the Annual Report 2007.

Toll revenues

The main income for ADM are the toll-revenues. The figures over the past years are:

Over 2007 ADM collected 1004 MDH in toll (direct pay at booths and season tickets) and 82 MDH in other revenues (2006:254 MDh resp. 56 MDh). Due to increasing traffic and opening of more (new) toll-roads the income from toll has nearly doubled since 2004 (534 MDH)
Historical figures show a steady growth, starting in 1991 at 46 MDh, 118 in 1995, 342 in 2000 and 640 in 2005.

The top-3 earners are: (2007 and 2006 figures)
 Casablanca-Rabat       -  306 MDh (252 MDh)
 Rabat-Tanger           -  269 MDh (212 MDh)
 Casablanca - Marrakech -  219 MDh (117 MDh)

Revenues are used to pay for companies management (28%), interest and other financing costs (47%) and partial repayment of loans (25%)

Daily management
Besides developing new roads and manage these projects, daily operation of existing motorways is also a very important responsibility of the company. This includes daily and major maintenance, promote road-security and collect toll-revenues

Workforce
The company employs 597 people, and this total is quite stable over the past years. This figure includes only ADM's own workforce: many more Moroccan and foreign people are working on the ongoing building-projects, but these work for the contractors or subcontractors.
The percentage of female personnel at the end of 2007 is 8% (at 47 female against 550 male).

Road safety
One of the goals of ADM is to increase road-safety in Morocco starting on their own roads. ADM reports details on serious accidents. A serious accident is an accident with at least one injured or killed person. The four reported figures are:
 serious accidents
 serious accidents with one or more people killed
 number of serious injured people
 number of killed people
All these figures are reported in absolute numbers as well as in relation to the total number of traveled distance on their motorways. This number is reported per 100 million travelled kilometer.

Figures 2006 and 2007 
The information over 2006 and 2007 are based on the safety-reports on the ADM website in 2008. When comparing these figures with the 2007 data as reported in 2009 (the 2008 year-report) the numbers don't match. Therefore, it is difficult to compare the newest numbers with the old 2007 and 2006 statistics. The previous reported details are used for the tables and information below.
In 2007 762 accidents with casualties were reported, a 5% increase on 2006. The accident-rate per 100 million traveled kilometers dropped by 20% from 30,2 to 24,1 between these years, but the total number as well as rate of deaths didn't go down.

A breakdown of these figures:

See also
 Autoroutes of Morocco
 Toll road
 Péage

External links
 ADM website in

References

All statistical figures and financial data from ADM website 

Road transport in Morocco
Autoroutes in Morocco
Road authorities
Transport organizations based in Morocco